Andrzej Trzebiński (1922 – 1943) was a Polish poet, essayist, and playwright.

During the German occupation of Poland, Trzebiński studied at the secret University of Warsaw. He was also editor of the right-wing cultural magazine Sztuka i Naród (Art and Nation) He was arrested by the Nazis and executed in Warsaw on November 12, 1943.

References

1922 births
1943 deaths
People condemned by Nazi courts
20th-century Polish dramatists and playwrights
Polish male dramatists and playwrights
Polish resistance members of World War II
20th-century Polish poets
Polish male poets
20th-century Polish male writers
Polish civilians killed in World War II